The Timor oriole (Oriolus melanotis) is a species of bird in the family Oriolidae. It is endemic to the Lesser Sundas, where it is found on Timor, Rote and Semau Islands. Its natural habitats are subtropical or tropical dry forests and subtropical or tropical mangrove forests.

Taxonomy and systematics
The Wetar oriole (O. finschi), found on Wetar and Atauro Islands, was originally described as a separate species but was later reclassified as a subspecies. However, more recent revisions to the IOC World Bird List have found it to be a distinct species. The two species were formerly grouped together as olive-brown oriole.

References

Timor oriole
Timor oriole
Birds of Timor
Timor oriole
Timor oriole
Taxonomy articles created by Polbot